Snizhana Dmytrivna Onopko (born 15 December 1986) is a Ukrainian model.

Early life
Born 15 December 1986 in Severodonetsk, Onopka moved to the Ukrainian capital, Kyiv, in 2001. While there, she was spotted by a foreign scout at the age of 15 and thus began her career as a model.

Career
In 2005, Steven Meisel photographed Onopka for the Prada and Dolce & Gabbana fall ad campaigns, sparking a booking frenzy thereafter and he then photographed her for two covers of Italian Vogue. In September 2005, she debuted by closing Marc by Marc Jacobs show in New York and also opened the Dolce & Gabbana and Karl Lagerfeld shows. In 2006, Steven Meisel photographed her for Calvin Klein and Dolce & Gabbana campaigns, Mert Alas and Marcus Piggot photographed her for a Louis Vuitton campaign and Juergen Teller photographed her for Yves Saint Laurent. The same year, Onopka became the face of Lanvin, replacing Lily Donaldson. Onopka has appeared on the cover of i-D, Numéro, Harper's Bazaar, L'Officiel, Allure Russia,  Elle Ukraine, Glamour Russia and the Italian, Portuguese, Japanese, and French editions of Vogue. On the runway, Onopka has walked for designers including Chanel, Gucci, Anna Sui, Balmain, Dolce & Gabbana, Marc Jacobs and Isabel Marant.

In September 2006, Onopka was unfairly mentioned in the New York Times article, "When Is Thin Too Thin?" along with fellow models Natasha Poly and Hana Soukupová

During the New York's Fall/Winter 2007 fashion shows, Onopka was noticeably absent, because she was shooting the Shiseido Spring/Summer 2007 campaign. However, at the start of  Milan Fashion Week she was back in full force walking for shows including Burberry, Jil Sander, Gucci and Dolce & Gabbana.

Throughout her career, Onopka has also appeared in advertising campaigns for Prada, Lanvin, ck Calvin Klein, Yves Saint Laurent, Louis Vuitton eyewear, Shiseido, Gucci, Gucci Eau de Parfum II, Max Mara, Hugo by Hugo Boss, Hugo by Hugo Boss eyewear, Etro and Emilio Pucci eyewear.

In September 2017, Onopka briefly returned to the runway and opened the Natasha Zinko show at London Fashion Week.

Personal life
Onopka was quoted in Teen Vogue saying this about her family: "My mother collects tear sheets of everything she sees me in."  And about her father: "My father was in a rock band when I was growing up, so he's used to the spotlight. I like to sing, too." According to Ukrainian media, she was previously engaged in 2009 to Ukrainian businessman Oleksandr Onyshchenko.

In 2011, Onopka married Ukrainian businessman Mykola (Nikolay) Shchur. In 2020, she stated that her husband had physically abused her throughout the marriage, while also adding that he did not agree to divorce her and wanted to take away her property.

References

External links

1986 births
Living people
Ukrainian female models
People from Sievierodonetsk
Models from Kyiv